A magnetar is a type of neutron star with an extremely powerful magnetic field (∼109 to 1011 T, ∼1013 to 1015 G). The magnetic-field decay powers the emission of high-energy electromagnetic radiation, particularly X-rays and gamma rays.

The existence of magnetars was proposed in 1992 by Robert Duncan and Christopher Thompson. Their proposal sought to explain the properties of transient sources of gamma rays, now known as soft gamma repeaters (SGRs). Over the following decade, the magnetar hypothesis became widely accepted, and was extended to explain anomalous X-ray pulsars (AXPs). , 24 confirmed magnetars were known.

It has been suggested that magnetars are the source of fast radio bursts (FRB), in particular as a result of findings in 2020 by scientists using the Australian Square Kilometre Array Pathfinder (ASKAP) radio telescope.

Description
They are formed by the collapse of a star with a mass 10–25 times that of the Sun. The density of the interior of a magnetar is such that a tablespoon of its substance would have a mass of over 100 million tons. Magnetars are differentiated from other neutron stars by having even stronger magnetic fields, and by rotating more slowly in comparison. Most magnetars rotate once every two to ten seconds, whereas typical neutron stars rotate one to ten times per second. A magnetar's magnetic field gives rise to very strong and characteristic bursts of X-rays and gamma rays. The active life of a magnetar is short compared to other celestial bodies. Their strong magnetic fields decay after about 10,000 years, after which activity and strong X-ray emission cease. Given the number of magnetars observable today, one estimate puts the number of inactive magnetars in the Milky Way at 30 million or more.

Starquakes triggered on the surface of the magnetar disturb the magnetic field which encompasses it, often leading to extremely powerful gamma-ray flare emissions which have been recorded on Earth in 1979, 1998 and 2004.

Magnetic field 
Magnetars are characterized by their extremely powerful magnetic fields of ∼109 to 1011 T. These magnetic fields are a hundred million times stronger than any man-made magnet, and about a trillion times more powerful than the field surrounding Earth. Earth has a geomagnetic field of 30–60 microteslas, and a neodymium-based, rare-earth magnet has a field of about 1.25 tesla, with a magnetic energy density of 4.0 × 105 J/m3. The magnetic field of a magnetar would be lethal even at a distance of 1,000 km due to the strong magnetic field distorting the electron clouds of the subject's constituent atoms, rendering the chemistry of known lifeforms impossible. At a distance of halfway from Earth to the moon, an average distance between the Earth and the Moon being , a magnetar could wipe information from the magnetic stripes of all credit cards on Earth. , they are the most powerful magnetic objects detected throughout the universe.

As described in the February 2003 Scientific American cover story, remarkable things happen within a magnetic field of magnetar strength. "X-ray photons readily split in two or merge. The vacuum itself is polarized, becoming strongly birefringent, like a calcite crystal. Atoms are deformed into long cylinders thinner than the quantum-relativistic de Broglie wavelength of an electron." In a field of about 105 teslas atomic orbitals deform into rod shapes. At 1010 teslas, a hydrogen atom becomes 200 times narrower than its normal diameter.

Origins of magnetic fields
The dominant theory of the strong fields of magnetars is that it results from a magnetohydrodynamic dynamo process in the turbulent, extremely dense conducting fluid that exists before the neutron star settles into its equilibrium configuration. These fields then persist due to persistent currents in a proton-superconductor phase of matter that exists at an intermediate depth within the neutron star (where neutrons predominate by mass). A similar magnetohydrodynamic dynamo process produces even more intense transient fields during coalescence of pairs of neutron stars. But another theory is that they simply result from the collapse of stars with unusually strong magnetic fields.

Formation 

In a supernova, a star collapses to a neutron star, and its magnetic field increases dramatically in strength through conservation of magnetic flux. Halving a linear dimension increases the magnetic field strength fourfold. Duncan and Thompson calculated that when the spin, temperature and magnetic field of a newly formed neutron star falls into the right ranges, a dynamo mechanism could act, converting heat and rotational energy into magnetic energy and increasing the magnetic field, normally an already enormous 108 teslas, to more than 1011 teslas (or 1015 gauss). The result is a magnetar. It is estimated that about one in ten supernova explosions results in a magnetar rather than a more standard neutron star or pulsar.

1979 discovery 
On March 5, 1979, a few months after the successful dropping of satellites into the atmosphere of Venus, the two unmanned Soviet spaceprobes, Venera 11 and 12, were hit by a blast of gamma radiation at approximately 10:51 EST. This contact raised the radiation readings on both the probes from a normal 100 counts per second to over 200,000 counts a second, in only a fraction of a millisecond.

This burst of gamma rays quickly continued to spread. Eleven seconds later, Helios 2, a NASA probe, which was in orbit around the Sun, was saturated by the blast of radiation. It soon hit Venus, and the Pioneer Venus Orbiter's detectors were overcome by the wave. Seconds later, Earth received the wave of radiation, where the powerful output of gamma rays inundated the detectors of three U.S. Department of Defense Vela satellites, the Soviet Prognoz 7 satellite, and the Einstein Observatory. Just before the wave exited the Solar System, the blast also hit the International Sun–Earth Explorer. This extremely powerful blast of gamma radiation constituted the strongest wave of extra-solar gamma rays ever detected; it was over 100 times more intense than any known previous extra-solar burst. Because gamma rays travel at the speed of light and the time of the pulse was recorded by several distant spacecraft as well as on Earth, the source of the gamma radiation could be calculated to an accuracy of about 2 arcseconds. The direction of the source corresponded with the remnants of a star that had gone supernova around 3000 BCE. It was in the Large Magellanic Cloud and the source was named SGR 0525-66; the event itself was named GRB 790305b, the first-observed SGR megaflare.

Recent discoveries

On February 21, 2008, it was announced that NASA and researchers at McGill University had discovered a neutron star with the properties of a radio pulsar which emitted some magnetically powered bursts, like a magnetar. This suggests that magnetars are not merely a rare type of pulsar but may be a (possibly reversible) phase in the lives of some pulsars. On September 24, 2008, ESO announced what it ascertained was the first optically active magnetar-candidate yet discovered, using ESO's Very Large Telescope. The newly discovered object was designated SWIFT J195509+261406. On September 1, 2014, ESA released news of a magnetar close to supernova remnant Kesteven 79. Astronomers from Europe and China discovered this magnetar, named 3XMM J185246.6+003317, in 2013 by looking at images that had been taken in 2008 and 2009. In 2013, a magnetar PSR J1745−2900 was discovered, which orbits the black hole in the Sagittarius A* system. This object provides a valuable tool for studying the ionized interstellar medium toward the Galactic Center. In 2018, the temporary result of the merger of two neutron stars was determined to be a hypermassive magnetar, which shortly collapsed into a black hole.

In April 2020, a possible link between fast radio bursts (FRBs) and magnetars was suggested, based on observations of SGR 1935+2154, a likely magnetar located in the Milky Way galaxy.

Known magnetars

, 24 magnetars are known, with six more candidates awaiting confirmation. A full listing is given in the McGill SGR/AXP Online Catalog. Examples of known magnetars include:
 SGR 0525−66, in the Large Magellanic Cloud, located about 163,000 light-years from Earth, the first found (in 1979)
 SGR 1806−20, located 50,000 light-years from Earth on the far side of the Milky Way in the constellation of Sagittarius and the most magnetized object known.
 SGR 1900+14, located 20,000 light-years away in the constellation Aquila. After a long period of low emissions (significant bursts only in 1979 and 1993) it became active in May–August 1998, and a burst detected on August 27, 1998 was of sufficient power to force NEAR Shoemaker to shut down to prevent damage and to saturate instruments on BeppoSAX, WIND and RXTE. On May 29, 2008, NASA's Spitzer Space Telescope discovered a ring of matter around this magnetar. It is thought that this ring formed in the 1998 burst.
SGR 0501+4516 was discovered on 22 August 2008.
 1E 1048.1−5937, located 9,000 light-years away in the constellation Carina. The original star, from which the magnetar formed, had a mass 30 to 40 times that of the Sun.
 , ESO reports identification of an object which it has initially identified as a magnetar, SWIFT J195509+261406, originally identified by a gamma-ray burst (GRB 070610).
 CXO J164710.2-455216, located in the massive galactic cluster Westerlund 1, which formed from a star with a mass in excess of 40 solar masses.
SWIFT J1822.3 Star-1606 discovered on 14 July 2011 by Italian and Spanish researchers of CSIC at Madrid and Catalonia. This magnetar contrary to previsions has a low external magnetic field, and it might be as young as half a million years.
3XMM J185246.6+003317, discovered by international team of astronomers, looking at data from ESA's XMM-Newton X-ray telescope.
 SGR 1935+2154, emitted a pair of luminous radio bursts on 28 April 2020. There was speculation that these may be galactic examples of fast radio bursts.
 Swift J1818.0-1607, X-ray burst detected March 2020, is one of five known magnetars that are also radio pulsars. By its time of discovery, it may be only 240 years old.

Bright supernovae
Unusually bright supernovae are thought to result from the death of very large stars as pair-instability supernovae (or pulsational pair-instability supernovae). However, recent research by astronomers has postulated that energy released from newly formed magnetars into the surrounding supernova remnants may be responsible for some of the brightest supernovae, such as SN 2005ap and SN 2008es.

See also

 Neutron star
 Soft gamma repeater
 Pulsar

References
Specific

Books and literature
 
 

General

External links

 McGill Online Magnetar Catalog McGill Online Magnetar Catalog -- Main Table

Star types
 
Stellar phenomena